Barry Goldwater is a bronze sculpture depicting American politician and businessman of the same name by Deborah Copenhaver Fellows, installed at the United States Capitol's National Statuary Hall, in Washington, D.C., as part of the National Statuary Hall Collection. The statue was donated by the U.S. state of Arizona in 2015, and replaced a statue of John Campbell Greenway, which the state of Arizona gifted to the collection in 1930.

The statue was installed in the March 28, 2014 and unveiled March 31 at the Arizona Capitol.  It remained there until being moved to Washington, D.C., for its unveiling in the National Statuary Hall Collection.

See also
 2015 in art

References

External links
 

2015 establishments in Washington, D.C.
2015 sculptures
Barry Goldwater
Bronze sculptures in Washington, D.C.
Monuments and memorials in Washington, D.C.
Goldwater, Barry
Sculptures of men in Washington, D.C.